Brooklynn Prince (born May 4, 2010) is an American child actress widely known for her critically acclaimed role in the 2017 film The Florida Project, for which she won the Critics Choice Movie Award for Best Young Performer. She has since starred in the horror film The Turning and the streaming television series Home Before Dark.

Career 
Prince's parents, including her acting coach mother, began her career at age two, as she appeared in print and screen advertisements for Parenting, Chuck E. Cheese's, and Visit Orlando, among others. 

In 2017, she starred in The Florida Project, for which she received critical praise. Director Sean Baker has said that Brooklynn was the Spanky in his take on the Little Rascals. She has since taken leading roles in The Lego Movie 2: The Second Part and The Angry Birds Movie 2.

In 2020, Prince starred in the horror film The Turning. She headlined the Apple TV+ series Home Before Dark, which is based on the life of Hilde Lysiak, a nine-year-old journalist. She also starred in the Disney+ movie The One and Only Ivan, voicing Ruby the elephant.

Filmography

Awards and nominations

References

External links 

Living people
American child actresses
American film actresses
American television actresses
American voice actresses
Actresses from Florida
21st-century American actresses
2010 births